Earnestville or Ernestville may refer to:

Earnestville, Kentucky
Earnestville, Florida, a former town in Pasco County, Florida
Ernestville, Missouri